Paul Constance (born 11 May 1947) is a former Australian rules footballer who played with Carlton in the Victorian Football League (VFL).

Notes

External links 

Paul Constance's profile at Blueseum

1947 births
Carlton Football Club players
Australian rules footballers from Victoria (Australia)
Living people